Saints Tiburtius and Susanna are two Catholic saints that are otherwise unrelated but venerated on the same day:

Saint Susanna ( 3rd century), a Christian martyr of the Diocletianic persecution
Saint Tiburtius (died  286), a Christian martyr